Spiral binding may refer to:

 The spiral binding process, also known as coil binding.
 The Spiral Binding Company Inc, specializing in spiral binding